Łukasz Targosz (born 20 February 1977 in Kraków) is a Polish film composer, and music and film producer. A graduate from The Karol Szymanowski Academy of Music in Katowice (Jazz and Pop Music Department) in 2002.

He started his career as a session musician. 
After writing music for a movie entitled The Crown Witness, he gained recognition. 
He received two awards for his film music: in 2010 during Roma Fiction Fest for the best music written for a TV series Marked and during Los Angeles Cinema Festival of Hollywood (Winter 2015) for music composed for The Last Waltz. Radiostation RMF Classic as well as its listeners awarded Łukasz Targosz with MocArty for The Best Film Music of 2014 written to a TV series The Pack produced by HBO Poland.

He can boast of over 40 soundtracks for various cinematic projects – to begin with art house, through mainstream movies and animation, to end with new generation historic movies such as Stones for the Rampart by Robert Gliński, long-awaited screen version of a classical Polish novel by Aleksander Kamiński. A romantic comedy entitled Letters to St. Nicolas achieved box-office success in Poland while the soundtrack quickly reached gold record status; Love and Dance is the first Polish dance movie which was watched by a record-breaking number of viewers; Insiders – a thriller TV series was reviewed as one of the best Polish TV series; Marked was nominated during such festivals as RoseD'or, Monte-Carlo Television Festival and Roma Fiction Fest; the animation entitled The Game, which he also co-produced, was awarded during numerous international festivals, e.g. Boston International Film Festival, Mexico International Film Festival, On Location: Memphis International Film and Music Fest, Canada International Film Festival, Indie Fest. What is more, The Game was the only Polish animation which stood a chance to win an Oscar for the year 2012. He was also a co-producer of Floating Skyscrapers by Tomasz Wasilewski, one of top award-winning Polish movies in 2013 (International Film Festival in Karlovy Vary, T-Mobile New Horizons, Gdynia Film Festival).

He cooperated with various well-known artists, among them: Jennifer Batten (together they performed solos for Michael Jackson's Dirty Diana, which was used in the movie entitled Love and Dance), Renata Przemyk, Grzegorz Turnau, Janusz Radek, Robert Janowski, Doda, Afromental band.

He is a co-owner of the Music Production Studio SPOT which was found in 1999.

Discography
Music composed to:

Films 
 2019 – The Coldest Game
 2016 – Planet Single
 2014 – Służby specjalne
 2014 – Kamienie na szaniec aka Stones for the Rampart
 2012 – Hans Kloss. Stawka większa niż śmierć
 2011 – Letters to St. Nicolas
 2011 – Los numeros
 2010 – Skrzydlate świnie aka Flying Pigs
 2009 – Kochaj i tańcz aka Love and Dance
 2008 – Kierowca aka Limousine
 2007 – Świadek koronny aka The Crown Witness
 2006 – Być kwiatem

Short movie 
 2014 – Mocna kawa wcale nie jest taka zła aka Strong Coffee Isn't That Bad
 2014 – Ostatni walc aka The Last Waltz
 2013 – Mały palec aka Pinky
 2011 – Mika

TV series 
 2020 – The Woods (television series)
 2015 – 2016 - Pakt aka The Pact
 2015 – Służby specjalne
 2014 – Wataha aka The Pack
 2012 – 2014 – The Doctors
 2012 – 2014 – Friends
 2012 – 2014 – True Law
 2011 – Układ Warszawski aka Warsaw Pact
 2011 – Wszyscy kochają Romana (Polish TV series based on an American sitcom Everybody Loves Raymond)
 2011 – Instynkt aka Instinct
 2010 – 2011 – Usta usta (Polish TV series based on the British series Cold Feet)
 2010 – 2011 – Klub szalonych dziewic (Polish TV series based on Rozengeur & Wodka Lime) 
 2010 – 2011 – Prosto w serce (Polish TV series based on an Argentinian soap opera Sos mi vida)
 2009 – Naznaczony aka Marked
 2008 – 2009 – 39 i pół
 2008 – 2009 – BrzydUla (Polish TV series based on a Colombian telenovela Yo soy Betty, la fea)
 2007 – Odwróceni aka Insiders
 2006 – 2007 – Hela w opałach (Polish TV series based on an American sitcom Grace Under Fire)
 2005 – 2009 – Niania (Polish TV series based on an American sitcom The Nanny)

Animation 
 2014 – 2015 – Mrówka szuka męża aka Ant is getting married
 2014 – 2015 – Proszę mnie przytulić aka Hug me please
 2014 – 2015 – Basia
 2014 – 2015 – Latający Miś i spółka aka The Flying Bear and The Gang
 2013 – 2014 – Myszy strajkują aka Mice on Strike
 2013 – 2014 – Bear Me
 2013 – 2014 – Head's Life
 2012 – 2014 – Agi Bagi
 2012 – 2014 – Fennec
 2011 – The Game

Co-producer 
 2014 – 2015 – Mrówka szuka męża aka Ant is getting married
 2014 – 2015 – Proszę mnie przytulić aka Hug me please
 2014 – 2015 – Basia
 2014 – 2015 – Latający Miś i spółka aka The Flying Bear and The Gang
 2013 – 2014 – Myszy strajkują aka Mice on Strike
 2013 – Płynące wieżowce aka Floating Skyscrapers
 2013 – Mały palec
 2013 – 2014 – Myszy strajkują aka Mice on Strike
 2013 – 2014 – Bear Me
 2013 – 2014 – Head's Life
 2012 – 2014 – Agi Bagi
 2012 – 2014 – Fennec
 2011 – The Game

References

External links
 
 Muzyczne Studio Produkcyjne SPOT

1977 births
Living people
Musicians from Kraków
Polish composers
Polish film score composers
Male film score composers